"Gyalchester" is a song by Canadian rapper Drake from his mixtape, More Life (2017). The ninth track on the playlist, the song was written by Aubrey Graham, István Megyimorecz, Rico Brooks, and produced by iBeatz. The song features additional background vocals by Baka Not Nice, who is one of two credited musicians on More Life. The term is a portmanteau of the patois-spoken word for girl ("gyal") merged with the name of the Jamaican parish Manchester.

Commercial performance

North America
On April 8, 2017, "Gyalchester" entered the charts at number 13 and spent 19 weeks on the Billboard Canadian Hot 100. The song spent 11 weeks on the US Billboard Hot 100, entering the charts at number 29, its immediate peak, on April 8, 2017.

Internationally
The song has peaked in the top 40 in  the United Kingdom and has charted on the charts of France, Ireland, the Netherlands, Portugal, and Sweden (Heatseeker).

Music video
"Drake Shares "Gyalchester" Promo Clip in Anticipation of New OVO Store Opening" was released on August 2, 2017.

Live performances
On May 21, 2017, Drake performed "Gyalchester" at the 2017 Billboard Music Awards.

Charts

Weekly charts

Year-end charts

Certifications

References

2017 songs
Drake (musician) songs
Songs written by Drake (musician)